Robert John Baptist Noel (born 15 October 1962) is an Officer of Arms (Herald) at the College of Arms in London. Formerly the Bluemantle Pursuivant, he has been the Norroy and Ulster King of Arms since April 2021.

Early life 
The younger son of Gerard Eyre Wriothesley Noel, of Westington Mill, Chipping Campden, a barrister, he is in remainder to his grandfather's earldom. Robert Noel was educated at Ampleforth College, Exeter College, Oxford (MA) and St Edmund's College, Cambridge (MPhil).

Career 
Noel trained as a shipbroker, then as a library assistant at the College of Arms before joining the auctioneers, Christie's of London. He was appointed Bluemantle Pursuivant of Arms at the College of Arms in October 1992, and succeeded Sir Peter Gwynn-Jones (later Garter Principal King-of-Arms) as Lancaster Herald of Arms in Ordinary in September 1999. On 1 April 2021, he was appointed Norroy and Ulster King of Arms in succession to Timothy Duke.

He is a Freeman of the City of London and has been admitted as a liveryman of the Glaziers' Company.

Personal life 
Noel married Rowena Hale in 2013; the couple live in London and have a son, William (born in 2014). and a daughter Phoebe born 2016. He serves as the official genealogist for the Imperial Society of Knights Bachelor.

Arms

See also
College of Arms
Earl of Gainsborough
Genealogy
Heraldry

References

Heralds of Today: A Biographical List of the Officers of the College of Arms, London, 1987-2001, Hubert Chesshyre and Adrian Ailes, (Illuminata, London 2001)

External links
The College of Arms
CUHAGS Officer of Arms Index
Who's Who 2015 

1962 births
Living people
People educated at Ampleforth College
Alumni of Exeter College, Oxford
Alumni of St Edmund's College, Cambridge
English officers of arms
Knights of Malta
British genealogists
Robert